Nicola Domenico Sansone (born 10 September 1991) is an Italian footballer who plays as a forward for Serie A club Bologna. Born in Germany, he has represented the Italian national team.

Club career
Sansone was born in Munich in Germany and his first club was SV Neuperlach. At the age of 10, he transferred to Bayern Munich, where he progressed through the Junior Team. He made his debut for Bayern's reserve team in January 2010, in a 3. Liga match against Dynamo Dresden. He made three more appearances in the 2009–10 season, and was a regular in the team during the 2010–11 season. In October 2010, he was named on the substitutes bench for the first-team in a Bundesliga match against SC Freiburg. He was released in June 2011 after Bayern's reserves were relegated from the 3. Liga.

Sassuolo
On 21 January 2014, Sansone along with teammates Pedro Mendes and Aleandro Rosi joined Sassuolo from fellow Serie A club Parma. Sansone and Mendes both signed co-ownership deals, for €2.5 million and €500,000 respectively. Rosi however made a loan switch from Parma to Sassuolo, as part of the swap with Jonathan Rossini also in temporary deal.

In June 2014 Raman Chibsah and Sansone joined Sassuolo outright for an additional €5.75 million from Parma, as well as Parma bought back Mendes for €2.5 million.

Villarreal
On 7 August 2016, Sansone signed with Villarreal on a five-year contract reported to be in the region of €13 million. He made his club debut in a 1–1 away draw against Granada in La Liga, on 20 August, and scored his first goal for the club in a 2–0 away win over Málaga in La Liga, on 10 September.

Bologna
On 4 January 2019, he joined Italian club Bologna on loan with an obligation to buy.

International career
Sansone made his U17 debut in November 2007 along with Bayern teammate Roberto Soriano. Both players also called up to 2008 Minsk under-17 International Tournament He scored a goal in the second match, a 3–0 win against Belarus. However, he was not called up to 2008 UEFA European Under-17 Football Championship elite round in March.

He played for the Italy U19 team on 11 March 2009, the second match of the 2009–10 season (for which only players born in or after 1991 were eligible), and he was also called up to the team's next friendly match against Ukraine (class of 1990 team), as Ukraine was preparing for the 2009 UEFA European Under-19 Football Championship finals. He scored a goal in the match, which ended in a 2–2 draw. He then dropped from the team, as he did not receive a call-up to the U18 team (class of 1991) for a friendly tournament in Slovakia. In November 2009, he was recalled to the U19 team for 2010 UEFA European Under-19 Football Championship qualification. He replaced captain Jacopo Sala in the first match, then started in the next two matches as a wing forward, partnered with forward Mattia Destro and Nicolao Dumitru against San Marino, ahead of Marco D'Alessandro, who started in the first match. In the last match against Republic of Ireland, Sansone was partnered with Destro in a 4–4–2 formation. Sansone was then selected in one of the three friendly matches before the 2010 UEFA European Under-19 Football Championship elite qualification, but never received a call-up again, as some of the players had recovered from injury and other players had returned from the U21 team (Fabio Borini and midfielder Soriano, etc.).

Sansone made his U20 debut in February 2012. He also played an unofficial friendly against the Italy under-21 Serie B representative team in December 2011.

On 31 May 2015 Sansone received his first senior Italy national team call-up from Antonio Conte.

On 16 June 2015, Sansone debuted for the Italian senior team after being substituted on for Stephan El Shaarawy in the 68th minute in a 1–0 friendly defeat to Portugal.

Style of play
Sansone is a fast and agile forward with a slender physique and an eye for goal. He possesses good technique and dribbling skills, which enable him to take on opponents in one on one situations. He is capable of playing as a second striker, but his preferred position is as a left winger, a position which allows him to cut into the centre to strike on goal with his favoured right foot or make attacking runs into the area in order to create space for teammates.

Career statistics

Club

International

References

External links
 
 Nicola Sansone at kicker.de 
 International Caps at FIGC.it 

1991 births
Living people
Association football forwards
People of Campanian descent
Footballers from Munich
Italian footballers
Italy international footballers
Italy youth international footballers
Italy under-21 international footballers
German footballers
Italian expatriate footballers
Italian expatriate sportspeople in Germany
Expatriate footballers in Germany
Italian expatriate sportspeople in Spain
German expatriate sportspeople in Spain
Expatriate footballers in Spain
German people of Italian descent
FC Bayern Munich II players
Parma Calcio 1913 players
F.C. Crotone players
U.S. Sassuolo Calcio players
Villarreal CF players
Bologna F.C. 1909 players
Serie A players
Serie B players
3. Liga players
La Liga players